The State Bar of Georgia is the governing body of the legal profession in the State of Georgia, operating under the supervision of the Supreme Court of Georgia. Membership is a condition of admission to practice law in Georgia.

The State Bar was established in 1964 as the successor of the prior voluntary Georgia Bar Association which was founded in 1884. The stated purpose of the State Bar of Georgia is to foster among the members of the Bar of this state the principles of duty and service to the public; to improve the administration of justice; and to advance the science of law.

The Bar has strict codes of ethics and discipline that are enforced by the Supreme Court of Georgia through the State Bar's Office of the General Counsel. Membership dues and other contributions help the Bar provide programs that are purportedly mutually beneficial to its members and the general public.

Membership
By order of the Supreme Court of Georgia (219 GA 873 and subsequent amendments), one is required before engaging in the practice of law to register with the State Bar and to pay the prescribed dues.

Following are statistics regarding State Bar of Georgia members as of March 2, 2015: 
 Active members in good standing: 37,031
 Inactive members in good standing: 8,562
 Emeritus members: 1,645
 Affiliate members: 20
 Student members: 148
 Foreign law consultants: 7
 Overall Membership: 47,143

Programs
The Bar offers a variety of programs:
 
 BASICS
 Committee to Promote Inclusion in the Profession
 Consumer Assistance Program
 Continuing Legal Education
 Cornerstones of Freedom Program
 Fee Arbitration
 Georgia Diversity Program
 Judicial District Professionalism Program
 Law-Related Education 
 Law Practice Management Program
 Lawyer Assistance Program
 Legislative Program
 Military Legal Assistance Program
 Pro Bono Resource Center
 SOLACE Program
 Transition Into Law Practice Program
 Unlicensed Practice of Law
 Young Lawyers Division

Ethics
Georgia lawyers are bound by strict rules of ethics in all of their professional dealings. The Georgia Rules of Professional Conduct help define a lawyer's obligations to clients, to the judicial system, and to the public.

Although the Supreme Court of Georgia retains ultimate authority to regulate the legal profession, the State Bar of Georgia's Office of the General Counsel serves as the Court's arm to investigate and prosecute claims that a lawyer has violated the ethics rules.

The Rules of Professional Conduct are found at Part IV, Chapter 1 of the Bar Rules. Part IV, Chapter 2 contains the procedural rules for disciplinary actions against lawyers. In addition to the Rules, the Bar and the Supreme Court periodically have issued Formal Advisory Opinions that clarify a lawyer's obligations in certain situations. A complete list of Formal Advisory Opinions follows Part IV, Chapter 3 of the Bar Rules.

Lawyers who would like to discuss an ethics dilemma with a member of the Office of the General Counsel staff should contact the Lawyer Helpline at 404-527-8720 or 800-334-6865.  Members of the public who believe that a Georgia lawyer has violated the rules of ethics should contact the Bar's Consumer Assistance Program at 800-334-6865.

Sections
Forty-five sections provide service to the legal profession and public. A conduit for information in particular areas of law, sections provide newsletters, programs and the chance to exchange ideas with other practitioners. The sections include:

 Administrative Law
 Agriculture Law
 Animal Law
 Antitrust Law
 Appellate Practice 
 Aviation Law
 Bankruptcy Law
 Business Law
 Child Protection & Advocacy
 Constitutional Law
 Consumer Law
 Corporate Counsel Law
 Creditors' Rights
 Criminal Law
 Dispute Resolution
 E-Discovery and the Use of Technology
 Elder Law
 Eminent Domain
 Employee Benefits Law
 Entertainment & Sports Law
 Environmental Law
 Equine Law
 Family Law
 Fiduciary Law
 Franchise & Distribution Law
 General Practice & Trial Law
 Government Attorneys
 Health Law
 Immigration Law 
 Individual Rights Law
 Intellectual Property Law
 International Law
 Judicial 
 Labor & Employment Law
 Law & Economics
 Legal Economics Law
 Local Government Law
 Military/Veterans Law
 Nonprofit Law
 Product Liability Law
 Professional Liability
 Real Property Law
 School & College Law
 Senior Lawyers
 Taxation Law
 Technology Law
 Tort & Insurance Practice
 Workers' Compensation Law

Leadership
Day-to-day operations of the State Bar of Georgia are directed by an Executive Director.

The State Bar of Georgia Officers include a President, President-Elect, Treasurer, Secretary, Immediate Past President, Young Lawyers Division (YLD) President, YLD President-Elect and YLD Immediate Past President.

The Board of Governors is the 160-member policy making authority of the State Bar, with representation from each of Georgia's judicial circuits. The board holds regular meetings five times per year. It elects six of its members to serving on the Executive Committee with the organization's officers. The Executive Committee meets monthly and exercises the power of the Board of Governors when the board is not in session.

Offices

The State Bar of Georgia has three offices: in Atlanta, Savannah and Tifton.

The headquarters of State Bar of Georgia, known as the Bar Center, is located at 104 Marietta Street NW, Atlanta, GA 30303. Phone 404-527-8700.

The South Georgia Office is located at 244 E. Second Street, Tifton, GA 31793. Phone 229-387-0446.

The Coastal Georgia Office is located at 18 E. Bay Street, Savannah, GA 31401. Phone 912-239-9970.

Headquarters building

The headquarters building was originally the Federal Reserve Bank of Atlanta which opened in 1918.

Young Lawyers Division

All newly admitted members of the State Bar automatically become members of the Young Lawyers Division (YLD). Membership in the YLD terminates at the end of the fiscal year after (1) the lawyer's 36th birthday or (2) the fifth anniversary of the lawyer's first admission to practice, whichever is later.

It has been strengthened over the years through guidance by the State Bar of Georgia, its Executive Committee and Board of Directors, the Supreme Court, and through dedicated service rendered by its members. In keeping with its motto of "working for the profession and the public," the YLD has 27 hard-working committees that provide service to the public, the profession, and the Bar through an array of projects and programs. Through the years, the YLD has also gained national recognition by winning several American Bar Association awards for its projects and publications.

History

In 1878, the American Bar Association was founded at Saratoga Springs, NY. It soon began to encourage its members to form organizations of the legal profession in their respective states.

Five years later, in 1883, coincidental events occurred that would be entwined in history. In June, a frail, lonely and dyslexic Woodrow Wilson gave up on his failing law practice on Spring Street in Atlanta, which he described as "dreadful drudgery."  Few noticed or cared when he boarded a northbound train bound for graduate school at Johns Hopkins. There was scarcely a less likely prospect to become, 30 years later, President of the United States. In September, the General Assembly, meeting at a building that combined the Atlanta city hall and Fulton County courthouse, appropriated one million dollars to build a new state capitol building on the same site.  And in Macon, five Georgia members of the American Bar Association had a conversation about forming a Georgia Bar Association.

The next year, 1884, there was a meeting in Atlanta to form the Georgia Bar Association. The initial members of the Georgia Bar Association were all the Georgia members of the ABA. They chose as the first state bar president L. N. Whittle, who was commander of the Macon Militia during the Civil War. Anyone experienced in the ways of voluntary organizations may appreciate the fact that Col. Whittle was detained at a college trustees meeting in Tennessee, so he was unable to attend the meeting at which he was elected president. His service as the first president of the Georgia Bar was a point too insignificant to be mentioned in his obituary two years later.

Macon headquarters
In the late 19th century, Macon was not only in the middle of the state geographically speaking; it was essentially the population center of Georgia and was easily accessible to the rest of the state. All roads and rail lines seemingly led to Macon. While neighboring Milledgeville had lost its status as state capital to Atlanta in the aftermath of a Civil War ransacking, Macon had been bypassed on Sherman's march to the sea, and the city by the Ocmulgee River prospered through the Reconstruction era. When the state's legal community formed the Georgia Bar Association in 1883, Macon was chosen as its headquarters location, and it remained so for the next 90 years. L.N. Whittle was the first of 10 Macon lawyers to serve as president of the Georgia Bar Association during its eight decades of existence. He and Walter B. Hill, also of Macon, who served as the first secretary/treasurer, were among 11 petitioners from around the state listed on the association's corporate charter when it was granted by the Superior Court of Bibb County on July 19, 1884.

Although membership remained strictly voluntary, the Georgia Bar Association gradually expanded its activities and organizational efforts throughout the state. In 1942, the association set up an office in downtown Macon, utilizing space in the Persons Building offered by the law firm of John B. Harris, who was then the secretary of the Georgia Bar and later served as its president. Beginning a practice in the same building in 1950, one floor above the Harris Firm, was a new lawyer named Frank C. Jones, who would later become president of the State Bar of Georgia. "During those years, I had frequent contact with Mr. Harris and his firm's personnel, including Madrid Williams, a remarkably able and talented individual," Jones said in a recent interview. "I was president of the Younger Lawyers Section in 1956-57 and worked closely with Mrs. Williams in that respect. John D. Comer, who was then practicing with the Harris Firm, and I served for several years as associate editors of the Georgia Bar Journal. We would review proposed articles and meet on a regular basis with Mr. Harris and Madrid to discuss the acceptability of these articles and other matters."

Unified Bar

Efforts to bring about a unified bar in Georgia began in the late 1920s and continued almost without interruption.  In 1963, soon after his inauguration, Governor Carl Sanders was visited by Atlanta lawyers Gus Cleveland and Harry Baxter, who had been delegated by the voluntary Georgia Bar Association to approach the Governor about supporting legislation to create a unified State Bar. It turned out to be an easier task than they expected, as the 37-year-old new lawyer-Governor immediately saw the advantages of an organized Bar capable of enforcing academic and professional standards for would-be lawyers along with a disciplinary process to protect the public from lawyer misconduct.

Sanders later recalled that, "Up until that time, while a fairly rigorous written Bar exam was required of every applicant, it was not nearly as comprehensive and onerous as the one we have today, and there was no multistate component. Also, the Bar association at the time was a toothless tiger, unorganized, with no right to discipline its members." The governor told Baxter and Cleveland (who later served as State Bar president in 1971-72) that his administration would indeed support the unified Bar proposal. He directed his House of Representatives floor leader, future Attorney General Arthur Bolton, and the lieutenant governor, future Supreme Court Justice George T. Smith, to head up the legislative effort.

The harder task was actually passing the bill. "Any time you seek to change something that has been in existence for that many years, it's going to be difficult," Sanders said. "Like many other lawyers, I knew there were going to be some who would not be able to meet the requirements." He recalls there was vigorous opposition to the proposal under the Gold Dome. "I remember Johnnie Caldwell (who later served as the state's insurance commissioner) making a long speech in the House about Abraham Lincoln having read the law by candlelight in a log cabin in Illinois," Sanders said. "He said if that was good enough for Abe Lincoln, it was good enough for Georgia."  

In 1963 the General Assembly passed an Act (Ga. L. 1963, p. 70) stating that ". . . the Supreme Court of this State shall be authorized, upon a petition presented by the Georgia Bar Association, to establish, as an administrative arm of the court, a unified self-governing bar association to be known as the 'State Bar of Georgia' composed of all persons now or hereafter licensed to practice law in this State."  This Act recited that it gave the Supreme Court authority, upon recommendation of the Georgia Bar Association, to adopt rules and regulations for the organization of a unified bar and to define the rights, duties and obligations of members, including payment of a reasonable license fee, and to otherwise regulate and govern the practice of law in Georgia.

A committee of 22 lawyers was charged with taking the next steps, which included the preparation and filing of a petition with the Supreme Court of Georgia, asking for the Court's approval. Although some opposition was voiced at a hearing in October, the Court issued an order on Dec. 6, 1963, establishing the State Bar of Georgia.Pursuant to this grant of authority, the Supreme Court of Georgia created and established the State Bar of Georgia by court order on December 6, 1963. Thus, the State Bar of Georgia was created pursuant to the authority of the Supreme Court of Georgia and the Act of the Georgia General Assembly approved by the Governor on March 11, 1963 (Georgia Laws 1963, page 70).

The initial draft of the proposed rules for the new State Bar was discussed and agreed upon in an all-day meeting in the conference room of Frank Jones' law firm in Macon, under the leadership of Newell Edenfield of Atlanta, who chaired the organizational committee, and Holcombe Perry of Albany, who was president of the Georgia Bar Association in 1962-63. Attributing the successful incorporation of the Bar in large part to Perry's leadership as president, Jones said, "Holcombe worked hundreds of hours on this undertaking, and few, if any, other lawyers in Georgia could have achieved the success that he did."

In 1968, Jones was elected as the unified Bar's sixth president and the first of three from Macon. He says a highlight of his term was the Supreme Court of Georgia issuing resounding opinions in Wallace v. Wallace and Sams v. Olah, rejecting constitutional challenges to the State Bar of Georgia's existence.

Creation of the unified Bar was not without controversy. The only member of the Board of Governors ever "impeached" by the lawyers in his circuit was due to his support of bar unification.  Irwin Stolz was informally impeached—as there was no procedure for that—at a meeting of the Lookout Mountain Circuit Bar Association in 1963. He later served as State Bar president and on the Georgia Court of Appeals, and his law partner, Norman Fletcher, became Chief Justice of the Supreme Court. In their post-judicial careers, Stolz practices law in Athens and practices law and mediates in Rome.

Move of headquarters to Atlanta

During Frank Jones' presidency of the State Bar, the potential benefits of moving the Bar headquarters from Macon to Atlanta started to become obvious to him. In addition to quarterly meetings of the Board of Governors that were held around the state and the annual meeting that was almost always in Savannah, there were meetings of the Executive Committee and various general and special committees and other meetings that Jones sought to attend. "The great majority of these meetings were held in Atlanta, with virtually none in Macon, because Atlanta was more convenient to a majority of attendees and the facilities were limited in Macon," Jones said. "Madrid Williams or Judge Mallory C. Atkinson, our first general counsel, and sometimes both, usually accompanied me in traveling to Atlanta for such meetings and we would talk from time to time about the probable need someday to move the office to Atlanta." Jones also noted that Atlanta was shedding its reputation as what he called "kind of a sleepy metropolis." Starting in the 1960s, there was an explosive growth in the number of lawyers practicing in the Atlanta metropolitan area, and many law firms greatly increased in size.

In 1971-72, Jones served on the Governor's Commission on Judicial Processes, chaired by Hon. Bob Hall. The panel's recommendations resulted in the establishment of the Judicial Qualifications Commission (JQC) as a constitutional body and the Judicial Nominating Commission (JNC) by executive order of each of Georgia's governors. "The meetings of the JQC were invariably held in the Judicial Building because we reported our findings and recommendations to the Supreme Court of Georgia, and the meetings of the JNC were normally held in Atlanta as well," Jones said. "This is another illustration of how Atlanta increasingly became the focus of the activities of the State Bar and related organizations."

A Special Committee on State Bar Headquarters was appointed in 1970, with Jones as chairman and Ben L. Weinberg Jr. as vice chairman. Also serving were B. Carl Buice, Wilton D. Harrington, G. Conley Ingram, H.H. Perry Jr., Hon. Paul W. Painter and Frank W. "Sonny" Seiler, with then- Bar President Irwin W. Stolz Jr., A.G. Cleveland Jr. and Thomas E. Dennard Jr. as ex-officio members. In November 1971, the committee submitted its final report during a meeting of the Board of Governors, officially recommending that the State Bar headquarters be moved from Macon to downtown Atlanta because, in part, "Ideally, the headquarters should be reasonably close to the State Capitol area, as accessible as possible to those lawyers throughout the state who would enter Atlanta on the interstate and other highways, and at the same time not inconvenient to the large number of State Bar of Georgia members who have their offices in the business and financial district in Atlanta." The fact that the State Bar had been authorized by the Supreme Court of Georgia, and its rules had to be approved by the Supreme Court, was another persuasive reason why the headquarters should be in downtown Atlanta and within reasonable proximity to the Supreme Court.

The report acknowledged that the anticipated doubling of office space, addition of at least one more staff member, higher rental rates and salary scales prevailing in Atlanta and various other factors would result in a substantial increase in operating expenses. A dues increase would undoubtedly be required. One of the committee's recommendations specified: "The State Bar of Georgia should not give any further consideration at this time to building its own headquarters building (as some other state bars have done)." Jones said, "That was a wise decision at the time, I believe. We needed to walk before we could run."

After the committee's recommendations were unanimously approved by the Board of Governors, the wheels were set in motion for the move from Macon to Atlanta. F. Jack Adams joined committee members Seiler and Cleveland in submitting a detailed report concerning costs and a proposed dues increase, which was approved by the board in July 1972. Increased expenditures were estimated at just over $75,000, necessitating a dues increase of $20 per year. The target date for opening the new headquarters in the Fulton National Bank building was July 1, 1973. By Feb. 9, the contract had already been signed, construction of the offices was underway and moving vans were packed and ready to leave Macon for Atlanta. Seiler, who was the State Bar president that year, recounted, in his end-of-year report for the 1973 annual meeting, what happened next.

"I'll never forget that day," Seiler said of the planned moving day of Feb. 9. "Gus Cleveland, Jack Adams and I were in Cleveland, Ohio, attending the ABA National Conference of Bar Presidents. It was extremely cold in Cleveland, but the skies were clear. We knew that winter storms were harassing the South, and Gus and I had speculated as to whether or not the move could be accomplished. On the day of the intended move, I picked up a Cleveland paper and the headlines read 'Heavy Snow Hits Macon, Georgia,' and I knew darn well they weren't talking about Cubbege Jr. or Sr.!" (Cubbege Snow was the name of a father-son legal duo in Macon, with a third generation having since joined the practice.) The snow melted a few days later, and the new office was fully occupied on Law Day, May 1, 1973, two months ahead of schedule.

Performing an integral role in the move was Madrid Williams, who had originally informed the officers of her intention to retire as executive secretary on Jan. 1, 1973, rather than make the move to Atlanta. "But she got caught up in the excitement," Jones said, and instead of retiring, Williams wound up personally supervising the entire project, coordinating the moving and purchase of equipment, furniture and decorations, as well as interviewing and hiring new staff members. "Her help was invaluable during those first years after the move," Jones said of Williams, who in 1970 became one of the first women to serve as president of the National Association of Bar Executives. She did retire in 1976, a full 34 years after opening the first Georgia Bar Association office. f

According to Jones, opposition to the move from Macon to Atlanta was virtually non-existent, and the only backlash he received from below Georgia's fall line for having spearheaded the effort was some good-natured ribbing from his hometown colleagues. "When I accepted an invitation to become a partner in the firm of King & Spalding LLP in Atlanta as of July 1, 1977, several of my friends jokingly remarked that I was being run out of Macon because I had been instrumental in the move," Jones said. "But I had realized it would be an easier pill to swallow if a past president from Macon was the one making the recommendation."

Jones concluded, "In my judgment both then and now, it was essential that the State Bar have its headquarters conveniently located in downtown Atlanta in order to maximize its service to the lawyers of Georgia, the judiciary and the general public. Such a location provides ready access to the Supreme Court of Georgia, the Governor's Office, the General Assembly and other governmental agencies with which the State Bar has dealings from time to time. It is also consistent with the extraordinary growth in the number of practicing lawyers residing in the greater Atlanta area."

Georgia Bar Center

In 1995, the State Bar began an effort to establish a Bar Center that would be a professional gathering place for members of the profession from around the state.  After an exhaustive search and a struggle with financing, the State Bar purchased the former home of the Federal Reserve Bank of Atlanta. The Georgia Bar Center is reputedly the finest state bar headquarters in the United States, in the assessment of delegates to the ABA midyear meeting in 2011. It includes a conference center used for continuing legal education seminars and professional meetings almost daily, a law related education program that hosts over 10,000 school children each year, the offices of the State Bar and a number of other law related organizations. In addition, visiting bar members enjoy free parking when attending events in downtown Atlanta.

And adjoining the lobby is a small museum depicting a nineteenth-century law office near the site of the Bar Center, where Woodrow Wilson labored until he gave up the "dreadful drudgery" of law practice and boarded a northbound train in 1883.

Past Presidents

Past presidents of the former Georgia Bar Association and the State Bar of Georgia include the following.

Georgia Bar Association
This was the voluntary bar that existed in Georgia until 1964.

1884	L. N. Whittle, Macon	
1885	William M. Reese, Washington	
1886	Joseph B. Cumming, Augusta	
1887	Clifford Anderson, Macon	
1888	Walter B. Hill, Macon	
1889	Marshall J. Clarke, Atlanta	
1890	George A. Mercer, Savannah	
1891	Frank H. Miller, Augusta	
1892	John Peabody, Columbus	
1893	Washington Dessau, Macon	
1894	Logan E. Bleckley, Atlanta	
1895	William H. Fleming, Augusta	
1896	John W. Park, Greenville	
1897	Henry R. Goetchius, Columbus	
1898	John W. Akin, Cartersville	
1899	Hamilton McWhorter Lexington	
1900	 Joseph Rucker Lamar, Augusta	
1901	 H. W. Hill, Greenville	
1902	 Charlton E. Battle, Columbus	
1903	 Burton Smith, Atlanta	
1904	 Peter W. Meldrim, Savannah	
1905	 A. P. Persons, Talbotton	
1906	 T. A. Hammond, Atlanta	
1907	 A. L. Miller, Macon	
1908	 Samuel B. Adams, Savannah	
1909	 Jos. Hansel Merrill, Thomasville	
1910	 T. M. Cunningham Jr., Savannah	
1911	 Joel Branham, Rome	
1912	 Alex W. Smith, Atlanta	
1913	 Andrew J. Cobb, Athens	
1914	 Robert C. Alston, Atlanta	
1915	 Sam S. Bennet, Albany	
1916	 George W. Owens, Savannah	
1917	 William H. Barrett, Augusta	
1918	 Orville A. Park, Macon	
1919	 Samuel H. Sibley, Atlanta	
1920	 Luther Z. Rosser, Atlanta	
1921	 Alexander R. Lawton, Savannah	
1922	 Arthur G. Powell, Atlanta	
1923	 Z. D. Harrison, Atlanta	
1924	 William M. Howard, Augusta	
1925	 H. H. Swift, Columbus
1926	 Leo W. Branch, Quitman
1927	 Warren Grice, Macon
1928	 Millard Reese, Brunswick
1929	 John M. Slaton, Atlanta
1930	 Rembert Marshall, Atlanta
1931	 A. W. Cozart, Columbus
1932	 Hatton Lovejoy, LaGrange
1933	 Marion Smith, Atlanta
1934	 H. F. Lawson, Hawkinsville
1935	 Graham Wright, Rome
1936	 A. B. Lovett, Savannah
1937	 Alexander W. Smith Jr., Atlanta
1938	 William C. Turpin Jr., Macon
1939	 Joseph B. Cumming, Augusta
1940	 John L. Tye Jr., Atlanta
1941	 William Y. Atkinson, Newnan
1942	 Frank D. Foley, Columbus
1943	 John B. Harris, Macon
1944	 Marvin A. Allison, Lawrenceville
1945	 Charles J. Bloch, Macon
1946	Charles L. Gowen, Brunswick
1947	 Robert B. Troutman, Atlanta
1948	 Vance Custer, Bainbridge
1949	 Albert J. Henderson, Canton
1950	 Alexander A. Lawrence, Savannah
1951	 A. Edward Smith, Columbus
1952	 F. M. Bird, Atlanta
1953	 William Butt, Blue Ridge
1954	 Edward A. Dutton, Savannah
1955	John J. Flynt Jr, Griffin
1956	Henry L. Bowden, Atlanta
1957	Howell Hollis, Columbus
1958	 Carl K. Nelson, Dublin
1959	Robert M. Heard, Elberton
1960	Newell Edenfield, Atlanta
1961	 H. C. Eberhardt, Valdosta
1962	 Maurice C. Thomas, Macon
1963	 H. H. Perry Jr., Albany
1964	 Hugh M. Dorsey Jr., Atlanta
1965	 Will Ed Smith, Eastman

State Bar of Georgia
The current mandatory bar was instituted in 1965.

1964	Hugh M. Dorsey Jr., Atlanta	
1965	Will Ed Smith, Eastman	
1966	Henry P. Eve, Augusta	
1967	Omer W. Franklin Jr., Valdosta	
1968	David H. Gambrell, Atlanta	
1969	Frank C. Jones, Macon	
1970	Howell C. Erwin Jr., Athens	
1971	Irwin W. Stolz Jr., LaFayette	
1972	A. Gus Cleveland, Atlanta	
1973	Frank W. Seiler, Savannah	
1974	F. Jack Adams, Cornelia	
1975	Cubbedge Snow Jr., Macon	
1976	W. Stell Huie, Atlanta	
1977	Harold G. Clarke, Forsyth	
1978	Wilton D. Harrington, Eastman	
1979	Charles H. Hyatt, Decatur	
1980	Kirk M. McAlpin, Atlanta	
1981	Robert Reinhardt, Tifton	
1982	J. Douglas Stewart, Gainesville	
1983	Frank Love Jr., Atlanta	
1984	Richard Y. Bradley, Columbus	
1985	Duross Fitzpatrick, Macon	
1986	Jule W. Felton Jr., Atlanta
1987	Robert M. Brinson, Rome	
1988	Littleton Glover Jr., Newnan
1989	A. James Elliott, Atlanta
1990	Gene Mac Winburn, Athens
1991	Evans J. Plowden Jr., Albany
1992	Charles T. Lester Jr., Atlanta
1993	Paul Kilpatrick Jr., Columbus
1994	John C. Sammon, Decatur
1995	Harold T. Daniel Jr., Atlanta
1996	Robert W. Chasteen Jr., Fitzgerald
1997	Ben F. Easterlin IV, Atlanta
1998	Linda A. Klein, Atlanta
1999	William E. Cannon Jr., Albany
2000	Rudolph N. Patterson, Macon
2001	George E. Mundy, Cedartown
2002	James B. Franklin, Statesboro
2003	James B. Durham, Brunswick
2004	William D. Barwick, Atlanta
2005	Rob Reinhardt, Tifton
2006	Robert Ingram, Marietta
2007	Vincent Cook, Athens
2008	Gerald M. Edenfield, Statesboro
2009	Jeffrey O. Bramlett, Atlanta
2010	Bryan M. Cavan, Newnan
2011	S. Lester Tate III, Cartersville
2012	Kenneth L. Shigley, Atlanta
2013	Robin Frazer Clark, Atlanta
2014      Charles L. Ruffin, Macon
2015      Patrise M. Perkins-Hooker, Atlanta
2016      Robert J. "Bob" Kauffman, Douglasville
2017      Patrick T. O'Connor, Savannah
2018      Brian D. "Buck" Rogers, Atlanta
2019      Kenneth B. Hodges III, Albany
2020      Darrell Sutton, Marietta
2021      Elizabeth L. Fite, Atlanta

References

Georgia Bar Association presidents

State Bar of Georgia presidents

External links
 State Bar of Georgia
 How to Deal with GA State Bar Disciplinary Matters – Part 1 - A white paper covering every stage of the Bar complaint process, from initial notification through the public Formal Complaint stage reviewed by the Georgia Supreme Court.

Georgia
1964 establishments in Georgia (U.S. state)
Organizations established in 1964